CDIO may refer to:
CDIO Initiative (Conceive Design Implement Operate), an educational framework that stresses engineering fundamentals
Chief information officer (CIO), or chief digital information officer (CDIO)
Chief digital officer (CDO), or chief digital information officer (CDIO)